Events from the year 1730 in Scotland.

Incumbents 

 Secretary of State for Scotland: vacant

Law officers 
 Lord Advocate – Duncan Forbes
 Solicitor General for Scotland – John Sinclair, jointly with Charles Erskine

Judiciary 
 Lord President of the Court of Session – Lord North Berwick
 Lord Justice General – Lord Ilay
 Lord Justice Clerk – Lord Grange

Events 
 12 March – John Glas deposed from the Church of Scotland; the Glasite sect forms around him.
 The Glasgow Linen Society is formed.
 Francis Hutcheson takes office as Professor of Moral Philosophy in the University of Glasgow, where he will lecture in English rather than Latin.
 Iron smelting at Abernethy using ore from Tomintoul.
 Perth–Dunkeld–Inverness road completed.
 Lebanon cedar tree introduced to Scotland.

Births 
 14 December – James Bruce, explorer of the Nile (died 1794)
 John Murray, 4th Earl of Dunmore, governor of the Province of New York (died 1809 in England)
 Probable year – Charlotte Lennox, novelist and poet (born in Gibraltar; died 1804 in England)

Deaths 
 25 December – Henry Scott, 1st Earl of Deloraine, army officer (born 1676)
 James Johnstone, 2nd Marquess of Annandale, art collector (born c. 1687/8; died in Italy)

The arts
 James Thomson's poem cycle The Seasons is first published complete.

See also 

 Timeline of Scottish history

References 

 
Years of the 18th century in Scotland
Scotland
1730s in Scotland